The Ohio Aviators are an American rugby union team that played professionally in the short lived PRO Rugby competition. They are based in the Columbus, Ohio metropolitan area, and played their home games at Memorial Park in Obetz, Ohio. They are now playing in the newly formed World Tens Series.

History
PRO Rugby announced on February 9, 2016 the addition of Columbus, Ohio as the league's third team. The selection of Columbus came as somewhat of a surprise, because the original PRO Rugby announcement in November 2015 did not mention that the competition planned to place a team in the midwest in the inaugural season. Ohio's inaugural season home opener was played on May 1, 2016. PRO Rugby revealed the team's nickname — the Ohio Aviators — on June 6, 2016, a reference to the Wright brothers who were from Ohio.

10's return
On September 9, 2020, the Aviators announced on their Instagram page their return to participate in the World Tens Series, occurring from October 24 through November 7, 2020 in Bermuda.

Stadium
The Aviators during the 2016 season played their home games at Memorial Park in Obetz, a suburb of the Columbus metropolitan area. The Aviators planned to move to Fortress Obetz, on the site of the former Columbus Motor Speedway, starting with the 2017 season.

2016 roster

On December 20, 2016 all PRO Rugby players received notice their contracts will be terminated in 30 days if progress is not made towards resolving disputes between the league and USA Rugby.

The squad for the 2016 PRO Rugby season:

2016 coaching staff

Current players and staff

Current roster
The squad for the 2020 World Tens Series:

Current coaching staff

World Tens Series

2020

Bermuda

Season summaries

Leading players

Coaches

See also
 Ohio Aviators (basketball) — defunct ABA basketball team

References

Rugby clubs established in 2016
Sports teams in Ohio
2016 establishments in Ohio
Rugby union clubs disestablished in 2017
2017 disestablishments in Ohio
PRO Rugby teams
World Tens Series